Astrosat-1000 is the largest option in EADS Astrium's Astrosat family of satellite buses. Astrosat-1000 provides the basic structure for building satellites between 800 and 1200 kg in mass. It is the satellite bus used for the Pléiades-HR series of satellites.

References 

 https://web.archive.org/web/20120526224521/http://www.eoportal.org/directory/pres_PleiadesHRHighResolutionOpticalImagingConstellationofCNES.html

Satellite buses